"Better When You're Gone" is a song by French DJ David Guetta, Dutch DJ, record producer and electronic musician Brooks and American pop duo Loote. It was released as a single on 8 February 2019 by What a Music. The song was written by David Guetta, Ido Zmishlany, Thijs Westbroek, Jackson Foote, Emma Lov Block and Jeremy Dussoliet.

Background
On 31 January 2019, Guetta posted a teaser for the song on his Twitter account. The song is the second collaboration between Guetta and Brooks, after "Like I Do" in 2018. Brooks also done a remix of Guetta's track "Sun Goes Down" in 2015.

Track listing

Charts

Weekly charts

Year-end charts

References

2019 songs
2019 singles
David Guetta songs
Songs written by David Guetta
Songs written by Ido Zmishlany
Songs written by Kinetics (rapper)
Song recordings produced by David Guetta